Húsakórið is a Faroese choir situated in Copenhagen, Denmark. It is the oldest and largest Faroese choir outside the Faroe Islands, and has become an important social institution for Faroese living in the Copenhagen area. Its conductors have been Marianne Clausen (1978-2000), the famous Faroese composer Sunleif Rasmussen (2000-2001), and Tórður á Brúnni (2001–present). In 2004, the choir toured the Faroe Islands.

Discography 
 Sólarmessa, CD with 14 songs, Released in 2006 and again as Audio CD in 2011.

References

External links
Húsakórið 

Danish musical groups
Faroese choirs
Musical groups established in 1978